McRae School District No. 8 was a school district headquartered in McRae, Arkansas.

On July 1, 2004, it merged into the Beebe School District.

References

External links
 "McRae School District No. 8 White County, Arkansas Basic Financial Statements and Other Reports June 30, 2004"
 "McRae School District No. 8 White County, Arkansas General Purpose Financial Statements and Other Reports June 30, 2000"

2004 disestablishments in Arkansas
School districts disestablished in 2004
Defunct school districts in Arkansas
Education in White County, Arkansas